Dwayne Pentland (born February 28, 1953 in Vancouver, British Columbia) is a retired ice hockey player. He played in the World Hockey Association for the Houston Aeros.

Career statistics

External links

1953 births
Living people
Albuquerque Six-Guns players
Brandon Wheat Kings players
Canadian ice hockey defencemen
Edmonton Oilers (WHA) draft picks
Fort Wayne Komets players
Houston Aeros (WHA) players
Ice hockey people from Vancouver
New Haven Nighthawks players
New York Rangers draft picks
Oklahoma City Blazers (1965–1977) players
Providence Reds players
San Diego Mariners (PHL) players
Western International Hockey League players
Canadian expatriate ice hockey players in the United States